is a railway station in Chiyoda, Tokyo, Japan. East Japan Railway Company (JR East) and Tokyo Metro operate individual portions of the station.

Lines
 JR East
 Keihin-Tōhoku Line
 Yamanote Line
 Chūō Line (Rapid)
 Tokyo Metro
 Tokyo Metro Ginza Line

Station layout
Kanda consists of two separate stations that form an interchange. The elevated station is operated by JR East and the underground station is operated by the Tokyo Metro. Although they are an interchange, passengers must pass through ticket barriers and pay separate fares to switch between services.

JR East station
The JR East station is the older of the two stations and opened in 1919. It is situated on an elevated viaduct and has three island platforms serving six tracks. The platforms are numbered sequentially from east to west starting with platform 1. Yamanote Line trains use the inner platforms 2 and 3, Keihin-Tōhoku Line trains use platforms 1 and 4, and Chūō Line trains use platforms 5 and 6 as they split off from the main line north of Kanda.

There are two sets of entrances and exits (a total of four) that allow passengers to access the JR East station. The northern set, the north and east exits, offers a connection to the Ginza Line on the Tokyo Metro. The southern set, the south and west exits, has a View Plaza travel service centre. Both exits have rows of ticket machines, ticket gates, and a JR reservation office.

Tokyo Metro
The Tokyo Metro station is the newer of the two stations and opened in 1931 as part of an extension of first subway line in Asia, the Ginza Line. There is a simple island platform setup with two tracks.

Access to the station is provided by a total of six entrances and exits. Exits and 1 and 2 are used as the connection to the JR East station and are on Chūō-dōri (中央通り). Exits 3 and 4 are on the same street but in the centre of the station near Kanda-Kajichō. Exits 5 and 6 are at the northernmost part of the station.

The song "Omatsuri Mambo" (お祭りマンボ, Omatsuri Mambo) by Hibari Misora is used as the departure melody for the Ginza Line platforms in 2015.

History

The tracks of Tōhoku Main Line, now used by trains on the Keihin-Tōhoku Line and the Yamanote Line, extended from Akihabara Station to Kanda and further to Tokyo on November 1, 1925. This extension completed the loop of the Yamanote Line.

The subway station opened on November 21, 1931. On this day, the subway closed the temporary terminal at Manseibashi Station and made Kanda Station the new terminus. The station became an intermediate station on April 29, 1932 when the line was extended to Mitsukoshimae Station.

The station facilities of the Ginza Line were inherited by Tokyo Metro after the privatization of the Teito Rapid Transit Authority (TRTA) in 2004.

These are being reinstated by the Tōhoku Jūkan Line project. The project was due to be completed in 2013 but was subsequently delayed until 2015 as a result of the 2011 Tōhoku earthquake and tsunami.

From March 14, 2015 onwards, Keihin-Tōhoku rapid services began serving the station.

Station numbering was introduced to the JR East platforms in 2016 with Kanda being assigned station numbers JC02 for the Chūō line rapid, JK27 for the Keihin–Tōhoku Line, and JY02 for the Yamanote line. At the same time, JR East assigned the station a three-letter code to its major transfer stations; Kanda was assigned the code "KND".

Passenger statistics
In fiscal 2013, the JR East station was used by an average of 97,589 passengers daily (boarding passengers only), making it the fortieth-busiest station operated by JR East. In fiscal 2013, the Tokyo Metro station was used by an average of 52,612 passengers per day (exiting and entering passengers), making it the seventieth-busiest station operated by Tokyo Metro. The average daily passenger figures for each operator in previous years are as shown below.

 Note that JR East figures are for boarding passengers only.

See also

 List of railway stations in Japan

References

External links

 Kanda Station information (JR East) 
 Kanda Station information (Tokyo Metro) 

Chūō Main Line
Yamanote Line
Keihin-Tōhoku Line
Tokyo Metro Ginza Line
Stations of East Japan Railway Company
Stations of Tokyo Metro
Kanda Station
Kanda, Tokyo
Railway stations in Japan opened in 1919